Events from the year 1739 in Scotland.

Incumbents 

 Secretary of State for Scotland: vacant

Law officers 
 Lord Advocate – Charles Erskine
 Solicitor General for Scotland – William Grant of Prestongrange

Judiciary 
 Lord President of the Court of Session – Lord Culloden
 Lord Justice General – Lord Ilay
 Lord Justice Clerk – Lord Milton

Events 
 January (dated 9 February) – the original version of The Scots Magazine begins publication in Edinburgh.
 Suspended ministers of the "Associate Presbytery" (First Secession) led by Ebenezer Erskine are summoned to appear before the General Assembly of the Church of Scotland, but fail to attend because they do not acknowledge its authority.
 The six Independent Highland Companies known as the Black Watch are augmented to ten and formed into the 43rd Highland Regiment of Foot (the "Earl of Crawford's Highlanders"), a regular British Army regiment of the line. Its first colonel is John Lindsay, 20th Earl of Crawford (who on 22 July has been wounded at the Battle of Grocka).
 The potato is first cultivated in Scotland as a field crop, at Kilsyth.

Births 
 4 February – John Robison, physicist, inventor, natural philosopher and conspiracy theorist (died 1805)
 21 August – Archibald Campbell, British Army officer, colonial governor, landowner and politician (died 1791 in London)
 31 October – James Craig, architect (died 1795)
 James Anderson of Hermiston, agriculturalist (died 1808)
 Alexander Gordon, Lord Rockville, judge (died 1792)
 Udney Hay, American revolutionary and politician (died 1806 in the United States)

Deaths 
 November – William Cockburn, physician (born 1669; died in London)

See also 

 Timeline of Scottish history

References 

 
Years of the 18th century in Scotland
Scotland
1730s in Scotland